Nunzio Di Roberto (born 21 September 1985) is an Italian footballer. He plays for Cavese.

Club career
He made his Serie B debut for Napoli in early 2004.

After playing more than 250 games in the second-tier Serie B, he finally made his top-level Serie A debut for Crotone at the age of 30 on 28 August 2016 as a late substitute in a game against Genoa. Three days later he was loaned back to the Serie B, to Cesena.

On 17 August 2018, he signed a two-year contract with Serie C club Juve Stabia.

On 23 July 2019, he signed with Cavese.

References

External links
 

1985 births
Living people
Footballers from Naples
Association football midfielders
Italian footballers
S.S.C. Napoli players
S.S.C. Giugliano players
Potenza S.C. players
Calcio Foggia 1920 players
Frosinone Calcio players
Taranto F.C. 1927 players
A.S. Cittadella players
S.S.D. Varese Calcio players
F.C. Pro Vercelli 1892 players
F.C. Crotone players
A.C. Cesena players
U.S. Salernitana 1919 players
S.S. Juve Stabia players
Cavese 1919 players
Serie A players
Serie B players
Serie C players
S.E.F. Torres 1903 players